Audrey, Wait! is a young adult romance novel by Robin Benway, published April 10, 2008 by Razorbill.

Reception 
Audrey, Wait! was generally well-received, including a starred review from Publishers Weekly, who said, "Audrey's phenomenal celebrity seems unlikely but she herself feels completely believable, and readers will find her both sympathetic and funny." They further noted, "Benway displays a keen ear for dialogue; this first novelist has a knack for showcasing her characters' wit as well as their sincere concern for one another."

Kirkus Reviews called the book a "pleasant little romp," noting that "[i]ndividual characterizations slop together a bit," but the "profusion of teen wit ... both quells the mayhem of Audrey’s life and holds the story together." They concluded, "Readers won’t find much substance here but they will find entertainment, well pitched to the target audience of mid-teen girls."

The book also received a positive review from Booklist.

However, Common Sense Media gave the book three out of five stars, saying it provided a "[g]ood lesson on fame's price" but  content "iffy content," including concerns regarding language; sex, romance, and nudity; products and purchases; and drinking, drugs, and smoking. They further expanded on this critique, saying, "Parents need to know that the main character has sex with her boyfriend, who also smokes pot. She drinks alcohol and makes out with a rock star after a concert. She lies to her parents but has a mostly affectionate relationship with them. The family spends time together and she respects their opinion of her."

References

See also 

2008 American novels
Novels set in California
Young adult romance novels
2008 children's books
Razorbill books